Adam Carl Muller (November 27, 1913 – December 21, 1991) was a politician from Alberta, Canada. He served in the Legislative Assembly of Alberta from 1967 to 1971 as a member of the Social Credit caucus in government.

Political career
Muller ran for a seat to the Alberta Legislature in the 1967 Alberta general election. He ran as the Social Credit candidate in the electoral district of Pembina. He defeated Progressive Conservative candidate Edward Samuel by 800 votes to hold the district for his party.

Muller retired from provincial politics at dissolution of the legislature in 1971.

References

External links
Legislative Assembly of Alberta Members Listing

1991 deaths
Alberta Social Credit Party MLAs
1913 births